Khalil Ziade Jr. is a Lebanese-American businessman, and former basketball player. He is a member of the board of directors of Growth Holdings, and the owner of the Lebanese basketball club Ibni Lubnan ( - Build Lebanon) formerly known as Jupiter basketball club. Khalil is the brother of Lebanese businessman Philippe Ziade.

Early life 
Khalil Ziade was born on 4 April 1985, in Harharaya - Al-Qattin, in the Keserwan District in Lebanon. He immigrated to the United States, where he obtained a BA in Construction Management and worked in real estate investment. In addition to his involvement in expat affairs, Khalil contributes, with his brother Philippe, to the development efforts of the Lebanese economy.

Sports 
Ziade invests in the sports sector in Lebanon. He acquired the majority of Jupiter basketball club shares when he was playing in the fourth division of the Basketball League in 2017. He changed the name of the club to Ibni Lubnan and lead it to the second division. In the 2020-2021 season, the club was close to reaching the first division, but it finished third.

Philanthropy 
Ziade was a major contributor to the relief initiatives following Beirut port explosion in 2020.

References 

Lebanese businesspeople
Lebanese emigrants to the United States
Lebanese basketball players
1985 births
Living people
Sportspeople of Lebanese descent